The men's 4 × 100 metres relay event at the 2020 Summer Olympics took place on 5 and 6 August 2021 at the Olympic Stadium. There were 16 competing relay teams, with each team having 5 members from which 4 were selected in each round.

Summary
During the final, Chijindu Ujah gave Great Britain the lead out of the blocks, Japan's Shuhei Tada and Canada's Aaron Brown also gaining relative to the stagger.  At the first handoff, Ujah passed efficiently to Zharnel Hughes, pulling away from Jamaica to their inside.  On the outside, Ryota Yamagata left too early for Tada to catch him inside the zone, Japan unable to make the handoff and ending their race.  Down the backstretch, 100 metres champion Marcell Jacobs received the baton from Lorenzo Patta and opened up space on Xie Zhenye to his inside, pulling Italy into contention, with Canada's pass from Jerome Blake to Brendon Rodney keeping them in the mix.  China loaded up their third leg with ace Su Bingtian pulling back some ground on GBR's Richard Kilty, while Jamaica had Yohan Blake, the second fastest man in history, running the bend.  Kilty passed efficiently to Nethaneel Mitchell-Blake, while Wu Zhiqiang had to slow down and look back to find Su with the baton, costing China the chance to battle for gold.  Italy passed from Fausto Desalu to Filippo Tortu about metre down from team GB.  Behind China, Jamaica and Germany, Rodney passed to Canada's star Andre De Grasse almost 5 metres behind.  From there De Grasse took off, passing three teams to move into third place, while over the final 50 metres Tortu produced a burst of speed combined with a perfectly executed final dip to take gold on the line. Italy had set a new national record with a time of 37.50, the 19th fastest performance ever and the 2021 world lead. China equalled their national record with 37.79, while Ghana was disqualified from 7th place because of a faulty baton pass.

During the Olympics, British athlete CJ Ujah tested positive on anabolic agent ostarine and steroid-like S-23 (drug), and was provisionally suspended, confirmed on 14 September by B-sample. On 18 February 2022, the British team was disqualified and officially stripped of the silver medal.  The International Olympic Committee requested that all members from Great Britain's relay team return their medals. Canada's relay team was awarded the silver medal, and China's relay team was awarded the bronze medal.

Background
This was the 25th 4 x 100 relay; it has been run every Olympics since 1912.

Qualification

National Olympic Committees (NOCs) could qualify one relay team in one of three following ways:
 The top 8 NOCs at the 2019 World Athletics Championships qualified a relay team.
 The top 8 NOCs at the 2021 World Athletics Relays qualified a relay team.
 Where an NOC placed in the top 8 at both the 2019 World Championships and the 2021 World Relays, the quota place was allocated to the world top list as of 29 June 2021. In this case, 4 teams did so, so there are 4 places available through the world rankings.

A total of five athletes may be entered for a relay team. Should a NOC have also entered individual athletes in the corresponding individual event (100 m), the entered individual athletes must be included in the total of five (5) athletes entered for the relay event. In addition of five, NOCs can nominate a maximum of one alternate athlete for each team.

The qualifying period was originally from 1 May 2019 to 29 June 2020. Due to the COVID-19 pandemic, the period was suspended from 6 April 2020 to 30 November 2020, with the end date extended to 29 June 2021. The qualifying time standards could be obtained in various meets during the given period that have the approval of the IAAF. Both indoor and outdoor meets are eligible. The most recent Area Championships may be counted in the ranking, even if not during the qualifying period.

Qualified teams 
A total of 16 NOCs qualified.
Entry number: 16 teams of 5 athletes each (80), plus alternates.

Top list before competition
Source: 4x100 Metres Relay - men - senior - outdoor - 2021

 38.27 , 1st in Gateshead (GBR), on 13 July 2021
 38.29	, 1st in Shenzhen (CHN), on 20 March 2021
 38.29 , 2nd in Gateshead, on 13 July 2021
 38.32	, 1st at	Sportanlage am Weinweg, Regensburg (GER)	20 June 2021
 38.33	,	1st at GC Foster College, Spanish Town (JAM)	8 May 2021	
 38.45	,	1h2 at Stadion Śląski, Chorzów (POL)	1 May 2021	
 38.45	,	1h3	at Stadion Śląski, Chorzów (POL)	1 May 2021	
 38.49	,	2h3	at Stadion Śląski, Chorzów (POL)	1 May 2021 (DQ)
 38.53	,	1st at Yabatech Sport Complex, Lagos (NGR)	27 June 2021, first non-qualifier
 38.56	, 1st at	Centre sportif du Bout-du-Monde, Genève (SUI)	12 June 2021
 38.60	Florida State Seminoles, 3rd at Hayward Field, Eugene (USA)	11 June 2021

Season's bests for the other qualified teams:
 38.79	, 2h1 at	Stadion Śląski, Chorzów (POL), on 1	May 2021
 38.94	, 2f1 in	Cluj-Napoca (ROU), on 19 June 2021	
 38.98	, 3h2 at	Stadion Śląski, Chorzów (POL), on 1 May 2021
 39.06	, 4h2 at Stadion Śląski, Chorzów (POL), on 1 May 2021
 39.08	, 3h3 at	Stadion Śląski, Chorzów (POL), on 1 May 2021
 39.63	, 2nd at	The Bahamas National Stadium, Nassau (BAH)	28 June 2021

Competition format
The event continued to use the two-round format introduced in 2012.

Records
Prior to this competition, the existing world, Olympic, and area records were as follows.

The following national records were established during the competition:

Schedule
All times are Japan Standard Time (UTC+9)

The men's 4 × 100 metres relay took place over two consecutive days.

Team rosters
Each roster has 5 athletes plus 1 reserve (R, when known).

Heat 1
 Brazil: 
 Paulo André de Oliveira
 Rodrigo do Nascimento
 Derick Silva 
 Jorge Vides (R)
 Felipe Bardi dos Santos
 Great Britain:
 Chijindu Ujah
 Zharnel Hughes
 Reece Prescod (R)
 Richard Kilty
 Jona Efoloko (R)
 Nethaneel Mitchell-Blake
 Japan:
 Shuhei Tada
 Ryota Yamagata
 Yuki Koike
  (R)
  (R)
 Yoshihide Kiryū
 Jamaica:
 Nigel Ellis (R)
 Yohan Blake
 Tyquendo Tracey (R)
 Oblique Seville
 Jevaughn Minzie
 Julian Forte
 the Netherlands:
 Joris van Gool
 Churandy Martina
 Solomon Bockarie (R)
 Chris Garia
 Hensley Paulina (R)
 Taymir Burnet
 South Africa:
 Akani Simbine
 Clarence Munyai
 Shaun Maswanganyi
 Gift Leotlela (R)
 Chederick van Wyk
 Galaletsang Ramorwa (R)
 Trinidad and Tobago:
 Kion Benjamin
 Adell Colthrust (R)
 Eric Harrison Jr.
 Akanni Hislop
 Richard Thompson
 Jonathan Farinha (R)
 France:
 Jimmy Vicaut
 Mouhamadou Fall
 Amaury Golitin (R)
 Marvin René (R)
 Méba-Mickaël Zeze
 Ryan Zeze

Heat 2
 Canada:
 Bolade Ajomale (R)
 Bismark Boateng (R)
 Andre De Grasse
 Jerome Blake
 Brendon Rodney
 Gavin Smellie
 China:
 Su Bingtian
 Xie Zhenye
 Wu Zhiqiang
 Tang Xingqiang
 Yan Haibin (R)
 Sui Gaofei (R)
 Denmark:
 Frederik Schou-Nielsen
 Tazana Kamanga-Dyrbak
 Kojo Musah
 Simon Hansen
 
 
 Germany:
  (R)
 Lucas Ansah-Peprah
 Deniz Almas
 Joshua Hartmann
 Niels Torben Giese (R)
 Julian Reus
 
 Ghana:
Benjamin Azamati-Kwaku
Sean Safo-Antwi
Joseph Oduro Manu (R)
Joseph Amoah
Emmanuel Yeboah
Sarfo Ansah (R)
 Italy:
 Marcell Jacobs
 Filippo Tortu
 Fausto Desalu
 Lorenzo Patta
 Davide Manenti (R)
 Hillary Wanderson Polanco Rijo (R)
 Turkey:
 Ertan Özkan
 Kayhan Özer
 Oğuz Uyar (R)
 Ramil Guliyev
 Jak Ali Harvey
 Emre Zafer Barnes (R)
 United States:
 Trayvon Bromell
 Ronnie Baker
 Fred Kerley
 Micah Williams (R)
 Cravon Gillespie

Results

Results are from World Athletics:

Heats
Qualification Rules: First 3 in each heat (Q) and the next 2 fastest (q) advance to the Final

Heat 1

Heat 2

Final

References

Men's 4 x 100 metres relay
Olympics 2020
Men's events at the 2020 Summer Olympics